Christian Nielsen (born 24 March 1985), nicknamed Krølle (English: Curly), is a Danish former football player. 

Coming from Herfølge BK on July 1, 2007, he has mostly been used as a marginal player not having his final breakthrough, however, being a versatile player, he has played some games now on different positions on the field - mainly defence and midfield.

He left FC Nordsjælland in 2009.

External links
FC Nordsjælland profile

1985 births
Living people
Danish men's footballers
Herfølge Boldklub players
FC Nordsjælland players
Danish Superliga players

Association football midfielders
Association football defenders